The Gallie's Hall and Buildings is a historic site in Tallahassee, Florida. It is located off State Road 61, and held the city's first theater and only public hall until 1910. On October 20, 1980, it was added to the U.S. National Register of Historic Places.

References

External links

 Leon County listings at National Register of Historic Places
 Florida's Office of Cultural and Historical Programs
 Leon County listings
 Gallie's Hall and Building

Historic buildings and structures in Leon County, Florida
National Register of Historic Places in Tallahassee, Florida
Buildings and structures in Tallahassee, Florida
Theatres on the National Register of Historic Places in Florida
History of Tallahassee, Florida